Anton Schwartz (born July 16, 1967) is an American jazz saxophonist and composer based in Seattle, Washington and Oakland, California.

Biography

Anton Schwartz was born and raised in New York City, the son of Tony Schwartz, the audio documentarian and media theorist, and Reenah Lurie Schwartz. He attended The Dalton School, during which time he studied jazz privately with Warne Marsh and Eddie Daniels,
and studied advanced mathematics at New York University and Columbia University. He earned his Bachelor's, Phi Beta Kappa, in Mathematics and Philosophy at Harvard University in 1989, whereupon he entered the Doctoral program in Computer Science at Stanford University on a National Science Foundation Fellowship.
There he pursued research in artificial Intelligence, specializing in reinforcement learning.
He left the program to become a full-time musician, but not before earning a Master of Science degree along the way.

Musician 
He has released five CDs as a leader, on his own Antonjazz label.
They have garnered extensive national radio play
and strong reviews.
His 2006 CD, Radiant Blue, featured Peter Bernstein (guitar) and Taylor Eigsti (piano) and hit number Four on the U.S. jazz radio charts.
His most recent release, Flash Mob, featured Dominick Farinacci (trumpet) and Taylor Eigsti (piano) and enjoyed a long run on the radio Top 10.

Schwartz performs periodically at Yoshi's. One such performance was broadcast nationally in the U.S. as an hourlong episode of NPR's JazzSet.

Recent performances by Schwartz include an hourlong concert of unaccompanied saxophone for the 2013 San Francisco Jazz Festival
and as a soloist with the Boston Pops Orchestra at Boston Symphony Hall (2014).

Educator & Educational Technologist
In 2019, Schwartz released Random Roots, a music practice aid app that utilizes skill acquisition techniques such as varied practice, the spacing effect, the testing effect, context dependency, illusions of mastery and the generation effect.  In 2013, he described the practice methodology that inspired the Random Roots app in a blog post of the same name.

In 2021, he released ScaleMate, a music theory app aimed at helping musicians deepen their understanding of scales and musical harmony.

Schwartz is a faculty member of the California Jazz Conservatory in Berkeley, California,
has taught frequently at The Stanford Jazz Workshop, and has been Artist-In-Residence at Harvard University
and The Brubeck Institute.

Discography

 When Music Calls (1998, Antonjazz)
 The Slow Lane (2000, Antonjazz)
 Holiday Time (2004, Antonjazz)
 Radiant Blue (2006, Antonjazz)
 Flash Mob (2014, Antonjazz)

References

External links
Anton Schwartz's official web site
Anton Schwartz on Google Scholar
Music educational apps by Anton Schwartz on the App Store
Anton Schwartz on AllAbout Jazz
[ Anton Schwartz on Allmusic]

Mainstream jazz saxophonists
American jazz tenor saxophonists
American male saxophonists
American music educators
Jazz musicians from California
1967 births
Living people
Jewish American musicians
Harvard University alumni
Stanford University alumni
Soul-jazz saxophonists
Jewish jazz musicians
21st-century American saxophonists
21st-century American male musicians
American male jazz musicians
21st-century American Jews